was a Japanese businessman, writer and philatelist.

Life
Kanai's father was a wealthy Japanese businessman and at the age of five he began his first stamp collection. At 13, he intensified his hobby and while in university founded two stamp collecting clubs. His first degree was in engineering at Nihon University after which he studied political economy at Waseda University. He then worked for the textile machinery factory founded by one of his grandfathers. Later, he became president of a number of companies such as the Kanai Heavy Industry Co.

Philately

At first, Kanai was a general stamp collector but after World War II he specialised in the philately of Japan, Finland and the British colonies. Through philatelic contacts he became aware of and eventually owned a unique collection of the Red and Blue Mauritius "Post Office" stamps, when he procured a total of six pieces of 27 known copies of these valuable stamps, which was the largest ever owned by one person. In 1971, he bought the Bordeaux Letter, a cover with both the one penny red and two penny blue stamps addressed to Bordeaux, for 120 million yen. At that time this was about 1 million US dollars, which would possibly equal about 6 million US dollars today. In 1988, he initially sold the Bordeaux Letter; the balance of the Kanai's Mauritius stamps were sold by David Feldman in 1993 at a Zurich auction. That part of the Kanai collection, being 183 pages of the classic issues of Mauritius, is listed by the Guinness World Records as the "Most expensive stamp collection". He received many awards and worked most recently as Director of the Stamp Museum Kobe.

Awards
 Japanese Medal of Honor: Blue Ribbon
 Lichtenstein award 1991
 Roll of Distinguished Philatelists 1993

Works
 Mauritius no kitte: 1847–59. Gaikoku Kitte Kenkyūkai (Ausländische-Briefmarken-Forschungsgesellschaft) Ōsaka, 1976.
 Hōsun no miryoku. Sōgensha, Ōsaka, 1980.
 Classic Mauritius: The Locally Printed Postage Stamps. Stanley Gibbons, London, 1981. 
 Hōsun itto. Yūshu Bunka Center (Philatelie-Kulturzentrum), Ōsaka, 1991.

References and sources

External links
 David Feldman's 1993 Mauritius auction catalogue

Japanese philatelists
Japanese businesspeople
1925 births
2012 deaths
Signatories to the Roll of Distinguished Philatelists
Fellows of the Royal Philatelic Society London